The white-shouldered fire-eye (Pyriglena leucoptera) is a species of bird in the family Thamnophilidae. It is mainly found in the Atlantic Forest of southern Brazil and eastern Paraguay. Its natural habitats are subtropical or tropical moist lowland forest and subtropical or tropical moist montane forest.

The white-shouldered fire-eye was described by the French ornithologist Louis Vieillot in 1818 and given the binomial name Turdus leucopterus. The specific name is from the Ancient Greek leukopteros meaning "white-winged". The current genus Pyriglena was introduced by the German ornithologist Jean Cabanis in 1847. The species is monotypic.

References

Further reading

External links
Xeno-canto: audio recordings of the white-shouldered fire-eye

white-shouldered fire-eye
Birds of the Atlantic Forest
white-shouldered fire-eye
Taxa named by Louis Jean Pierre Vieillot
Taxonomy articles created by Polbot